This is the list of the number-one albums of the UK Indie Breakers Chart during the 2000s.

Number-one albums

Notes

References

External links
Independent Albums Breakers at the Official Charts Company

Indie Breakers
2000s in British music
United Kingdom Indie Breakers